Simon Beaton (1888–1959) was a professional footballer, who played for Newcastle United and Huddersfield Town.

References

1888 births
1959 deaths
Footballers from Inverness
Scottish footballers
Association football defenders
English Football League players
Newcastle United F.C. players
Huddersfield Town A.F.C. players